Adrian is a city on historic route 66 in Oldham County, Texas, United States. The population was 166 at the 2010 census, up from 159 at the 2000 census.

Geography
Adrian is the geo-mathematical midpoint of Route 66, positioned  from both Chicago, Illinois, and Los Angeles, California.

US Route 66
Adrian, Texas bills itself as the midway point between Chicago and Los Angeles on historic Route 66 with signage proudly declaring "← Los Angeles 1139 miles — Chicago 1139 miles →" to travellers on the old highway who arrive from as far afield as Europe. The "US 66 midpoint" branding was adopted in 1995 on the advice of travel author and Route 66 Association founder Tom Snyder. Fran Houser, owner of the Midpoint Café restaurant, antique and souvenir shop from 1990 until 2012, is the basis for Flo of the "Flo's V-8 Café" diner in Cars. The café, built in 1928 and located between a motel and a former filling station, operated 24 hours a day during Route 66's heyday.

Other US 66 attractions in Adrian include a Lions Antique Museum which displays farm and ranch equipment from the 1920s to 1950s, a Windmill which draws water from a well drilled by the Rock Island Railroad and an Antique Ranch which offers antiques and barbecue. The long-closed Bent Door Café and trading post, built by Bob Harris in 1947 on the site of the 1940s Kozy Kottage Kamp, incorporates portions of a former air traffic control tower decommissioned after World War II; the tower windows originally slanted toward the runway, so the door is bent to match. The most recent Bent Door restoration efforts were made in 2009.

History

The community originated in 1900, when the Rock Island Railroad survey marked the site as a future station and shipping point. Former Texas Ranger Calvin G. Aten was one of the area's first settlers. He built a dugout west of the site for his family. The town was named after another early settler, Adrian Cullen. In 1909, the Chicago, Rock Island and Gulf Railway was completed through Adrian. The Iowa-based American-Canadian Land and Townsite Company attracted prospective farmers and businessmen to the community. J.P. Collier set up a printing press and dug a water well, running water pipe for the town's first infrastructure. By 1910, Adrian had a post office, several stores, and a newspaper – the Adrian Eagle. Approximately 50 people were living in the community in 1915. The slow growth rate was attributed to a lengthy drought and the difficulty of maintaining a sufficient water supply. Adrian became a stopping point for travelers on Route 66 and a shipping point for area wheat growers. A grain elevator was built in 1929 and the community organized a volunteer fire department during the 1940s.

Adrian was incorporated in 1953 and adopted a mayor-council form of government. During the latter half of the twentieth century, the population hovered around 220. By 2000, Adrian's population had declined to 159. It is one of two incorporated places in Oldham County, the other being the city of Vega.

Demographics

2020 census

As of the 2020 United States census, there were 128 people, 48 households, and 36 families residing in the city.

2000 census
As of the census of 2000, there were 159 people, 72 households, and 48 families residing in the city. The racial makeup of the city was 82.39% White, 1.26% Native American, 16.35% from other races. Hispanic or Latino of any race were 21.38% of the population.

There were 72 households, out of which 23.6% had children under the age of 18 living with them, 54.2% were married couples living together, 9.7% had a female householder with no husband present, and 33.3% were non-families. 31.9% of all households were made up of individuals, and 12.5% had someone living alone who was 65 years of age or older. The average household size was 2.21 and the average family size was 2.79.

In the city, the population was spread out, with 21.4% under the age of 18, 6.3% from 18 to 24, 22.0% from 25 to 44, 30.2% from 45 to 64, and 20.1% who were 65 years of age or older. The median age was 46 years. For every 100 females, there were 91.6 males. For every 100 females age 18 and over, there were 86.6 males.

The median income for a household in the city was $27,083, and the median income for a family was $33,750. Males had a median income of $33,333 versus $21,875 for females. The per capita income for the city was $17,966. About 13.6% of families and 24.1% of the population were below the poverty line, including 33.3% of those under the age of eighteen and 21.7% of those sixty five or over.

Education

Adrian is zoned to schools in the Adrian Independent School District.

Appearances in film
 Damage to the town by an F4 tornado was depicted in the opening sequence of the TV movie Tornado! starring Bruce Campbell and Shannon Sturges.

Climate
According to the Köppen Climate Classification system, Adrian has a semi-arid climate, abbreviated "BSk" on climate maps.

References

External links

 

Cities in Texas
Cities in Oldham County, Texas
Populated places established in 1900
1900 establishments in Texas